Venery may refer to:
 Venery (hunting) or medieval hunting
 Terms of venery or collective nouns